Là-Bas, translated as Down There or The Damned, is a novel by the French writer Joris-Karl Huysmans, first published in 1891. It is Huysmans's most famous work after À rebours. Là-Bas deals with the subject of Satanism in contemporary France, and the novel stirred a certain amount of controversy on its first appearance. It is the first of Huysmans's books to feature the character Durtal, a thinly disguised portrait of the author himself, who would go on to be the protagonist of all of Huysmans's subsequent novels: En route, La cathédrale and L'oblat.

History and plot
Là-Bas was first published in serial form by the newspaper L'Écho de Paris, with the first installment appearing on February 15, 1891. It came out in book form in April of the same year; the publisher was Tresse et Stock. Many of L'Écho de Paris''' more conservative readers were shocked by the subject matter and urged the editor to halt the serialisation, but he ignored them. Sale of the book was prohibited from French railway stations.

The plot of Là-Bas concerns the novelist Durtal, who is disgusted by the emptiness and vulgarity of the modern world. He seeks relief by turning to the study of the Middle Ages (chapter one contains the first critical appreciation of Matthias Grünewald's Tauberbischofsheim altarpiece) and begins to research the life of the notorious 15th-century child-murderer Gilles de Rais. Through his contacts in Paris (notably Dr. Johannes, modeled after Joseph-Antoine Boullan), Durtal finds out that Satanism is not simply a thing of the past but alive in turn of the century France. He embarks on an investigation of the occult underworld with the help of his lover Madame Chantelouve. The novel culminates with a description of a black mass.

Reception
Dave Langford reviewed La Bas for White Dwarf #88, and stated that "A lurid and influential book, containing that famous description of the Black Mass attended by Huysmans himself."

Adaptations
In screenplay form, Norman Mailer wrote a novel based on Huysmans's Là-Bas entitled Trial of the Warlock. This work was translated into Japanese by Hidekatsu Nojima  and published as a book entitled Kuro-Misa (Black Mass) by Shueisha in 1977.

Sources
 Robert Baldick The Life of J.-K. Huysmans (OUP, 1955; revised by Brendan King, Dedalus, 2006)Là-bas: A Journey into the Self translated by Brendan King (Dedalus, 2001)Là-Bas translated as The Damned by Terry Hale (Penguin Classics, 2001)

Further reading
 Bales, Richard (1992). "Huysmans' Là-Bas: The Apotheosis of the Word," Orbis Litterarum: International Review of Literary Studies, Vol. 47, No. 4, pp. 209–225.
 Huddleston, Sisley (1928). Articles de Paris. New York: The Macmillan Company, pp. 92–95.
 Ziegler, Robert (1982). "The Literary Experience of History in Huysmans' Là-Bas," West Virginia University Philological Papers, Vol. 28, pp. 62–69.
 Ziegler, Robert (1989). "Consumption, Death, and Textual Generation in Huysmans' Là-Bas," Degre Second: Studies in French Literature, Vol. 12, pp. 69–76.
 Ziegler, Robert (1999). "The Holy Sepulcher and the Resurrected Text in Huysmans's Là-Bas," French Forum, Vol. 24, No. 1, pp. 33–45.
 Ziegler, Robert (2002). "The Artist in Utopia: J.-K. Huysmans' Là-bas and Octave Mirbeau's La 628-E8." In: Beauty Raises the Dead: Literature and Loss in the Fin-de-siècle.'' University of Delaware Press, Newark/ Associated University Presses, London, pp. 114–145.

References

External links
Là-bas at Project Gutenberg

 

1891 French novels
Cultural depictions of Gilles de Rais
Decadent literature
Novels by Joris-Karl Huysmans
Novels first published in serial form
Satanism in popular culture
Symbolist novels
Works originally published in L'Écho de Paris